Solid Gold Pet is a manufacturer and a worldwide supplier of natural, holistic pet foods based in Chesterfield, Missouri.

History 
The founder of Solid Gold Pet, Sissy Harrington-McGill, raised Great Danes. In the early 1970s she traveled to Germany to acquire dogs, which led to her developing her own pet food brand.

Recent
Now, over 40 years later, Solid Gold Pet specializes in the development of dry and wet dog and cat foods which contain no preservatives or saturated fats, and are made of USDA Choice meats such as bison, lamb and chicken, and grains like whole grain brown rice, barley, oats and millet, instead of wheat, soy, or corn like most other manufacturers. The company also has dog treats and supplements for both cats and dogs.

In November 2020, Solid Gold Pet was acquired by a Chinese company based in Hongkong: “Solid Gold Pet, which markets itself as “America’s first holistic pet food,” has been purchased by Health & Happiness Group International Holdings Ltd. (H&H Group) for the sum of $163 million. The acquisition, reported in early November by Mergers & Acquisitions, marks H&H Group’s entry into the pet space, proving that the pet industry is indeed ripe for mergers and acquisitions.”

References

External links 
 

Cat food brands
Dog food brands
El Cajon, California